Scout's Camp is a closed railway station on the South Coast railway line in New South Wales, Australia. The station was opened to serve the NSW Boy Scouts Jamboree in 1946. The station opened in 1946 and closed the following year.

References

Disused regional railway stations in New South Wales
Railway stations in Australia opened in 1946
Railway stations closed in 1947